This article lists various water polo records and statistics in relation to the Soviet Union men's national water polo team and the Unified Team men's national water polo team at the Summer Olympics.

The Soviet Union men's national water polo team and the Unified Team men's national water polo team have participated in 10 of 27 official men's water polo tournaments.

Abbreviations

Team statistics

Comprehensive results by tournament
Notes:
 Results of Olympic qualification tournaments are not included. Numbers refer to the final placing of each team at the respective Games.
 At the 1904 Summer Olympics, a water polo tournament was contested, but only American contestants participated. Currently the International Olympic Committee (IOC) and the International Swimming Federation (FINA) consider water polo event as part of unofficial program in 1904.
 Related teams: Unified Team men's Olympic water polo team†, Kazakhstan men's Olympic water polo team (statistics), Russia men's Olympic water polo team (statistics), Ukraine men's Olympic water polo team.
 Last updated: 5 May 2021.

Legend

  – Champions
  – Runners-up
  – Third place
  – Fourth place
  – The nation did not participate in the Games
  – Qualified for forthcoming tournament
  – Hosts
 Team† – Defunct team

Number of appearances
Last updated: 5 May 2021.

Legend
 Year* – As host team
 Team† – Defunct team

Best finishes
Last updated: 5 May 2021.

Legend
 Year* – As host team
 Team† – Defunct team

Finishes in the top four
Last updated: 5 May 2021.

Legend
 Year* – As host team
 Team† – Defunct team

Medal table
Last updated: 5 May 2021.

Legend
 Team† – Defunct team

Player statistics

Multiple appearances

The following table is pre-sorted by number of Olympic appearances (in descending order), year of the last Olympic appearance (in ascending order), year of the first Olympic appearance (in ascending order), date of birth (in ascending order), name of the player (in ascending order), respectively.

Notes:
 Dmitry Gorshkov is listed in Russia men's Olympic water polo team records and statistics.
 Nikolay Kozlov is listed in Russia men's Olympic water polo team records and statistics.

Multiple medalists

The following table is pre-sorted by total number of Olympic medals (in descending order), number of Olympic gold medals (in descending order), number of Olympic silver medals (in descending order), year of receiving the last Olympic medal (in ascending order), year of receiving the first Olympic medal (in ascending order), name of the player (in ascending order), respectively.

 Number of four-time Olympic medalists: 0
 Number of three-time Olympic medalists: 5
 Last updated: 5 May 2021.

Legend and abbreviation
  – Hosts
 EUN – Unified Team
 URS – Soviet Union

Notes:
 Dmitry Gorshkov is listed in Russia men's Olympic water polo team records and statistics.
 Nikolay Kozlov is listed in Russia men's Olympic water polo team records and statistics.

Top goalscorers

The following table is pre-sorted by number of total goals (in descending order), year of the last Olympic appearance (in ascending order), year of the first Olympic appearance (in ascending order), name of the player (in ascending order), respectively.

Note:
 Dmitry Apanasenko is listed in Russia men's Olympic water polo team records and statistics.

Goalkeepers

The following table is pre-sorted by edition of the Olympics (in ascending order), cap number or name of the goalkeeper (in ascending order), respectively.

Last updated: 5 May 2021.

Legend
  – Hosts

Note:
 Alexander Tchigir is also listed in Germany men's Olympic water polo team records and statistics.

Coach statistics

Most successful coaches
The following table is pre-sorted by total number of Olympic medals (in descending order), number of Olympic gold medals (in descending order), number of Olympic silver medals (in descending order), year of winning the last Olympic medal (in ascending order), year of winning the first Olympic medal (in ascending order), name of the coach (in ascending order), respectively. Last updated: 5 May 2021.

Boris Popov led the Soviet Union men's national water polo team to win an Olympic gold medal in 1980 and a bronze medal in 1988. Four years later, he coached the Unified Team men's national water polo team to another bronze medal.

Legend
  – Hosts

Medals as coach and player
The following table is pre-sorted by total number of Olympic medals (in descending order), number of Olympic gold medals (in descending order), number of Olympic silver medals (in descending order), year of winning the last Olympic medal (in ascending order), year of winning the first Olympic medal (in ascending order), name of the person (in ascending order), respectively. Last updated: 5 May 2021.

Vladimir Semyonov, representing the Soviet Union, won three Olympic medals in a row between 1960 and 1968. As a head coach, he led the Soviet Union men's national water polo team to win an Olympic gold medal in 1972.

Soviet Boris Popov won a bronze medal at the Tokyo Olympics in 1964. He guided the Soviet Union men's national team to two Olympic medals in 1980 and 1988, and the Unified Team to a bronze medal in 1992.

Aleksandr Kabanov of the Soviet Union won a gold at the Munich Olympics in 1972, coached by Vladimir Semyonov. Eight years later, he won the second gold medal at the Moscow Olympics in 1980, coached by Boris Popov. As a head coach, he led Russia men's national team to win two consecutive medals in 2000 and 2004.

Legend
 Year* – As host team

Olympic champions

1972 Summer Olympics

1980 Summer Olympics

See also
 Kazakhstan men's Olympic water polo team records and statistics
 Russia men's Olympic water polo team records and statistics
 List of men's Olympic water polo tournament records and statistics
 Lists of Olympic water polo records and statistics
 Soviet Union at the Olympics
 Unified Team at the Olympics

Notes

References

Sources

ISHOF

External links
 Olympic water polo – Official website

.Olympics, Men
Olympic water polo team records and statistics